The Sudan gerbil (Gerbillus nancillus) is distributed mainly in central Sudan.

References

  Database entry includes a brief justification of why this species is listed as data deficient

Gerbillus
Rodents of Africa
Mammals described in 1923
Taxa named by Oldfield Thomas
Taxa named by Martin Hinton